Norman Tait (May 20, 1941 – May 21, 2016) was a Nisga'a First Nations sculptor and totem pole carver from northwestern British Columbia, Canada.

Background
Norman Tait was born in Kincolith (Gingolx) on the Nass River in BC. His father Josiah Tait, was also a carver, and his great-grandfather was Chief Alfred Watson Mountain, Sganism Sim'oogit. His brothers Alver Tait and Robert "Chip" Tait was also an accomplished woodcarvers, as is his son Isaac.

Tait was a member of the House of Luuya'as of the Laxsgiik (Eagle clan) and holds or has held the hereditary titles Na'ax-lax, Gawaakhl, and Naawootkw Lik'inskw lax galts'ap, the last meaning "Grizzly Bear Coming onto the Village."

Tait attended residential school in Alberta and later completed high school in Prince Rupert, British Columbia.

Art career

When he began carving in 1970, Tait sought out Nisga'a artifacts that he could study since there were no living Nisga'a master carvers for him to study. He worked with his father to raise the first Nisga'a totem pole in over 50 years. He later studied under the tutelage of the Haida carvers Freda Diesing and Gerry Marks.

During his career as a carver, Tait carved 39 totem poles. Many of these stand in British Columbia, including poles in Port Edward, Lax Kw'alaams, and Alert Bay. Five of his poles are in Vancouver, including poles at the University of British Columbia, Stanley Park, Capilano Mall, and the Native Education Centre.

He carved The Story of Big Beaver totem pole, a  pole installed in 1982 at the entrance to the Field Museum of Natural History in Chicago. In 1992, Tait raised a totem in Bushy Park in London, England. Tait  raised a totem pole to commemorate the opening of the Nisga'a Lisims Government building in New Aiyansh, BC, "Goothl Lisims", which translates as "the heart of the Nass". He has also carved poles standing in Osaka, Japan, and Germany, as well as many private collections.

Tait had a breakthrough in 1977 when the UBC Museum of Anthropology hosted a solo exhibit of 125 of his works. At the time, First Nations carvers were exhibited in group shows.

Tait was known for the realistic detailing of his sculptured carving, moon masks, two-dimensional doors, and jewellery.

Tait worked with his carving partner, Lucinda Turner. He began teaching Turner in 1991, and they subsequently collaborated on many carvings, including two major commissions for the Vancouver Stock Exchange. They also opened the working art gallery, Wilp's Tsaak Gallery: House of the Mischievous Man in West Vancouver.

In 2015, the West Vancouver Museum held a retrospective on Tait's work, his first solo exhibition since 1977.

References

References
 Jensen, Doreen, and Polly Sargent, Robes of Power: Totem Poles on Cloth  (Vancouver: University of British Columbia Press, 1986).
 Macnair, Peter L., Alan L. Hoover, and Kevin Neary, The Legacy: Tradition and Innovation in Northwest Coast Indian Art (Vancouver, BC: Douglas & McIntyre, 1984).

1941 births
2016 deaths
20th-century First Nations people
21st-century First Nations people
First Nations woodcarvers
Nisga'a people
Totem pole carvers